Rafael Rodríguez Rapún (1912–18 August 1937) was a Spanish football player, actor and soldier during the Spanish Civil War. He was the companion of Spanish poet Federico García Lorca.

Life 
A mining engineer by profession, great sportsman, Atlético Madrid football player, PSOE activist, Rafael Rodríguez Rapún was from a working-class background.

In 1933, he joined Federico García Lorca's La Barraca theater company as an actor. García Lorca affectionately nicknamed him "The Man with the Three Rs", in reference to his initials.

Luis Sáenz de la Calzada, a painter and also an actor of La Barraca, described his: "Kinky, hair, not very wide forehead furrowed by a deep transverse wrinkle; correct nose that gave him, to a certain extent, the profile of a Greek statue."

García Lorca and Rodríguez Rapún fell in love during the summer of 1935 tour of La Barraca, when he named him clerk of the company.

Once the assassination of García Lorca by Francoist militias was announced at the end of summer 1936, Rodríguez Rapún decided to join the front to defend the Republic during the Spanish Civil War. After undergoing artillery training in the town of Lorca, province of Murcia, he was sent to the Cantabrian front with a rank of lieutenant.

He died on August 18, 1937, during the Battle of Santander, a year after the assassination of his companion.

His memory was resurfaced by Ian Gibson in the book "Lorca y el mundo gay" in 2009 and by the writer and friend of Rafael María Teresa León, who considered him one the muses of the masterpiece los Sonetos del amor oscuro. Others believe, however, that the inspiration was Juan Ramírez de Lucas, another love interest of the poet.

References

1919 births
1937 deaths
Military personnel from Madrid
Spanish military personnel of the Spanish Civil War (Republican faction)
Male actors from Madrid
20th-century Spanish male actors
Spanish gay actors
Spanish male stage actors
20th-century Spanish LGBT people
Spanish LGBT sportspeople
Gay sportsmen
Gay military personnel
Military personnel killed in the Spanish Civil War
LGBT association football players
Burials at Ciriego Cemetery